This is a list of programmes broadcast on South Korean cable television channel Total Variety Network (tvN) Asia network.

Original programs (tvN Asia, tvN, O tvN, tvN go, XtvN, OCN) and acquired from (CJ E&M)

Live programming
Mnet Asian Music Awards

tvN Music x iQIYI
Asian Hits

tvN x Mnet
BTS Comeback Show
IZ*ONE CHU
I-Land
I Can See Your Voice
Kingdom: Legendary War
M Countdown
Produce 48
Produce X 101
Produce 101
Produce 101 Season 2
Queendom
Road to Kingdom
Running Girls (2020)
SuperM's As We Wish
Studying Girl
The Call
TMI News
X1 Flash
Wanna One Go
Wanna One Go: Zero Base
Wanna One Go: X-CON

tvN PRIMEDrama

Acquired from OCN
Black
Bad Guys: City of Evil 
Duel
Evergreen
Hell Is Other People
Life on Mars
Meloholic
Missing Noir M
Mistress
Player
Save Me
The Guest
Tunnel
The Virus 
Voice (TV Series) (Season 1-now)
Watcher

Acquired from CJ E&M
A Gentleman's Dignity (Originally aired in SBS, but produced by Hwa&Dam Pictures & CJ E&M)

tvN x O'live
K-Chef Battlefield
Kim Na-young's Lifestyle Tips
MasterChef Korea
One Night Food Trip
One Day Healing Trip
You Can Cook With Sam Kim
What Shall We Eat Today?
What Shall We Eat Today?: Delivery
What Shall We Eat Today?: Global Recipe

tvN x OnStyle
Get It Beauty

tvN x tvBlue
tvBlue is a Korean channel broadcasting in Vietnam from lease of VTC5, and collaboration of CJ ENM and SCTV, it was dissolved on July 2, 2018, but VTC5 still broadcasting.
Bạn Có Bình Thường
Hotgirl Loạn Thị

See also
 List of programs broadcast by TVN (South Korea)
 List of programs broadcast by Arirang TV
 List of programmes broadcast by Korean Broadcasting System
 List of programs broadcast by Seoul Broadcasting System
 List of programs broadcast by JTBC

Notes

Lists of television series by network
Lists of South Korean television series